KRI Nala (363) is an Indonesian Navy ship named after , a military commander of the Majapahit Empire.

Design 
Nala has a complement of 89 personnel, including 11 officers.

The ship are armed with one Bofors 120 mm Automatic Gun L/46, two Bofors 40 mm Automatic Gun L/70 and two Rheinmetall Mk 20 Rh-202 autocannons. For anti-submarine warfare, the ship is equipped with one Bofors 375 mm twin anti-submarine rocket launcher. For surface warfare, Nala was equipped with four Exocet MM 38 anti-ship missile launchers. Due to obsolescence, the ship never carried the missiles since early 2000s. Nala also has a flight deck and telescopic hangar astern and able to carry a single helicopter, unlike other ships in the class.

The ship's countermeasure systems consisted of two Vickers Mk 4 chaff launchers and T-Mk 6 torpedo decoy outfit. As built, the electronics and sensors consisted of HSA DA-05 air and surface surveillance radar, Decca AC 1229 surface warning radar, HSA WM-28 tracking radar, Van der Heem PHS 32 sonar and WCS WM20 fire-control system. As of 2009, some of them were replaced or upgraded, which were consisted of two Knebworth Corvus 8-tubed trainable chaff launchers, ECM MEL Susie-1 and Signaal LIROD fire-control system.

Service history 
Nala was laid down on 27 January 1978 at Wilton-Fijenoord, Schiedam, Netherlands. The ship was launched on 11 January 1979 and was commissioned on 4 August 1980.

The Nala was deployed to help look for the missing Adam Air Flight 574.

References

Printed sources 
 
 

Fatahillah-class corvettes
Ships built by Wilton-Fijenoord
1979 ships
Corvettes of the Cold War